Trithiapentalene is an organic bicyclic molecule containing two sulfur heterocycles. Its 10-π aromatic  structure is similar to naphthalene. There has been a literature dispute about whether the connectivity among the three sulfur atoms is a case of rapid tautomerization between two  valence tautomers or a 3-center 4-electron bond.  

The reactions have been little studied.  It forms a dinickel complex upon reaction with bis(allyl)nickel.

See also
 Dithiolium salt

References 

Sulfur heterocycles
Aromatic compounds
Heterocyclic compounds with 2 rings